Hiranyagarbha (IAST: hiraṇya-garbha) is an ancient Indian ritual ceremony involving the donation of a golden vessel. Throughout history, it was used as a purification ritual meant to "enhance" or "upgrade" the performer's social status and standing. One of the most noted examples of this was the change in the caste status of a high-ranking Nair monarch, such as the Zamorin, to that of a Kshatriya when he completed the ceremony. It is mentioned as one of the "Sixteen great gifts" in the historical texts.

Ritual 

The word hiranyagarbha literally means "golden womb": it signifies a golden pot (kunda) donated to a Brahmana, and also refers to the god Vishnu.

The donor performs an archana (worship ritual), and utters a mantra praising the lord Hiranyagarbha, that is, Vishnu. The performer then enters into the "golden womb", as the priests perform the rites usually performed for a pregnant woman: garbhadhana, pumsavana, and simantonnayana.

Next, the donor is taken out of the "golden womb", and the priests perform jatakarma and other rites usually performed for a newborn. The donor utters a mantra announcing a "rebirth" from the divine womb, and is called "born of the hiranyagarbha".

After the ceremony, the donor gives away the "golden womb" and other gifts to the priests.

History 

The Atharvaveda-parishishta, composed in the 1st millennium BCE, describes hiranyagarbha, besides tulapurusha and gosahasra donations. These three donations are included among the sixteen great gifts in the later text Matsya Purana; the relevant section of the text appears to have been composed during 550-650 CE. It states that several ancient kings performed the great gifts. The Linga Purana also mentions the sixteen great donations; according to R. C. Hazara, the relevant portion of the text was composed during c. 600-1000 CE, most probably after 800 CE. The great gifts are also described in the later digests devoted to the topic of charity (dāna), such as Ballala's Dana-sagara, and the Danakhanda section of Hemadri's Chaturvarga-chintamani (13th century).

The Chalukya king Pulakeshin I (c. 540-567) is known to have performed the hiranyagarbha ritual (although not mentioned as a great gift) to proclaim his sovereignty. The 7th century Pandya king Jayantavarman (alias Cendan), according to one of his inscriptions, performed three of the great gifts: hiranyagarbha, gosahasra, and tulapursuha.

The great gifts went on to become the principal sign of a king's beneficence, overlordship, and independence in the subsequent centuries. In particular, hiranyagarbha finds a mention in multiple historical inscriptions of Indian kings, including:

 King Attivarman (c. 4th century) of Ananda dynasty, who is called hiranyagarbha-prasava ("born of the golden womb") in the Gorantala inscription.
 Damodaravarman of Ananda dynasty.
 Vishnukundin king Madhavarman I, who is called hiranyagarbha-prasuta ("born of the golden womb") in the Ipur and Polamuru inscriptions.
 Mangalesha (r. c. 592-610 CE), who is called hiranyagarbha-sambhuta ("produced from the golden womb") in the Mahakuta Pillar inscription
 Dantidurga (r. c. 735-756) of Rashtrakuta dynasty
 Yashahkarna (r. c. 1073-1123) of Kalachuri dynasty of Tripuri
 Jaya Pala (r. c. 1075-1110)

References

Bibliography 

 
 
 
 
 
 

Rituals in Hindu worship
Donation